Bolt Upright was an American rap rock music group from Hollywood, California, United States, who were signed to Sony 550 Music.

History
Brothers Toriono and Damien Mayek grew up in Milwaukee, Wisconsin. Toriono began DJing at 13 years old and began producing hip hop records at 15. He produced the album for his own group, Def Supreme, during this time.

In 1996, both brothers moved to Los Angeles, California and formed Bolt Upright. The band signed to Sony's 550 Music in 1998 and released a five-track self-titled EP.

The band released its first and only LP Red Carpet Sindrome in 1999 and performed shows alongside Kid Rock, Powerman 5000, Kottonmouth Kings, Staind and Everlast.

Bolt Upright broke up in 2001.

The Mayek brothers still work in music. Damien operates a music production company named Damien Valentine Music. Toriono still uses the name Tory Tee as a DJ and is represented by DJ Factory Management Group and Hollywood & Vinyl Records.

Discography
Self-Titled EP (1998)
Red Carpet Sindrome (1999)

References

External links
 AllMusic
 Discogs
 DJ Tory Tee on Reverbnation
 Damien Valentine Music

Rap rock groups
Musical groups from Los Angeles
550 Music artists
Rapcore groups